Dreamcatcher is an album by the English composer David Lowe, under his Dreamcatcher moniker. Lowe would not record another Dreamcatcher album for almost a decade.

Track listing 

All tracks composed by David Lowe.

References

1997 albums